Dong Phu may refer to several places in Vietnam, including:

Đông Phú
Đông Phú, Quảng Nam, a township and capital of Quế Sơn District
Đông Phú, Bắc Giang, a commune of Lục Nam District
Đông Phú, Hậu Giang, a commune of Châu Thành District, Hậu Giang
Đông Phú, Thanh Hóa, a commune of Đông Sơn District

Đồng Phú
Đồng Phú District, a rural district of Bình Phước Province
Đồng Phú, Quảng Bình, a ward of Đồng Hới
Đồng Phú, Hanoi, a commune of Chương Mỹ District
Đồng Phú, Thái Bình, a commune of Đông Hưng District
Đồng Phú, Vĩnh Long, a commune of Long Hồ District